Vorzel is an urban-type settlement in Bucha Raion, Kyiv Oblast of Ukraine. It belongs to Bucha urban hromada, one of the hromadas of Ukraine. Population: 

It is home to Scripture Union's International Youth Camp.

History
The village was formed in 1905 (as the memorial plaque on the building of the Vorzelsky railway station says) on the 37th kilometer of the section of the Kovel railway, thanks to the collaboration of local landowners Krasovsky, Chaika, von Derviz, Saratovsky, Pekhovsky and Kicheeva.

During World War II the village was occupied by German troops on 22 September 1941. Two years later, in November 1943, Soviet troops took it back for the USSR without a fight.

Until 18 July 2020, Vorzel belonged to Irpin Municipality. In July 2020, as part of the administrative reform of Ukraine, which reduced the number of raions of Kyiv Oblast to seven, Irpin Municipality was merged into Bucha Raion.

During the Russian-Ukrainian war the village was shelled and then occupied by Russian troops in late February 2022. Until March 9, Vorzel was blocked by the Russian occupiers, leaving most houses without electricity, heat and water. It was only on March 9 that the evacuation of local residents began. Among the evacuees was the Ukrainian composer Ihor Poklad.

People from Vorzel 
 Serhiy Shapoval (born 1990), Ukrainian footballer

Gallery

References

External link

Bucha Raion
Urban-type settlements in Bucha Raion
Kyiv metropolitan area